Tylostomatidae is an extinct family of fossil sea snails, marine gastropod molluscs in the superfamily Stromboidea, the true conchs and their allies.

Genera
Genera within the family Tylostomatidae include:
 Tylostoma, the type genus

References 

 The Taxonomicon

Prehistoric gastropods
Stromboidea